Spiral Staircase is British folk musician Ralph McTell's second album. Produced by Gus Dudgeon and released in the UK in 1969, its opening track, "Streets of London", has become McTell's signature tune. "Rizraklaru" is an anagram of "Rural Karzi". The sleeve design was by Peter Thaine, a friend of McTell from Croydon Art College.

Track listing
All titles by Ralph McTell except where stated.

Side One
"Streets of London" - 4:06
"Mrs Adlam's Angels" - 2:43
"Wino and the Mouse" - 0:59
"England 1914" - 3:04
"Last Train and Ride" - 2:31
"The Fairground" - 4:07

Side Two
"Spiral Staircase" - 3:30
"Kind Hearted Woman Blues" (Robert Johnson) - 2:43
"Bright and Beautiful Things" - 1:53
"Daddy's Here" - 4:22
"Rizraklaru (Anag.)" - 1:44
"(My) Baby Keeps Staying Out all Night Long" (Buddy Moss) - 1:52
"Terminus" - 1:53

Personnel
Ralph McTell - guitar, vocals
Famous Jug Band
on "Last Train and Ride" and "Spiral Staircase"
Brian "Brock" Brocklehurst - double bass
Mick "Henry VIII" Bartlett - jug
"Whispering Mick" Bennett - washboard
Peter Berryman - second guitar
Mike Vickers - orchestral arrangements
Brian Gascoigne - musical direction

Production credits
Producer: Gus Dudgeon for Tuesday Productions
Engineer: Tom Allom at Regent Sound
Sleeve design: Peter Thaine
Liner notes: Ben Klein

Awards and accolades
McTell's song "Streets of London" won the Ivor Novello Award for songwriting in 1974.
A re-recorded version of "Streets of London" became a world-wide hit single in 1975.
During his 60th birthday concert at the Royal Festival Hall in November, 2004, McTell was presented with a Gold Disc of Spiral Staircase.

Release history

Many of the tracks on this album also feature in the Spiral Staircase - Classic Songs compilation.

Track variations

The UK 2007 CD release includes four bonus tracks that were re-mixed or re-recorded in 1970 for "Revisited":
14. "Spiral Staircase"
15. "Last Train and Ride"
16. "The Fairground"
17. "Terminus"

References

Ralph McTell albums
1969 albums
Albums produced by Gus Dudgeon
Transatlantic Records albums